Stanningfield is a village and former civil parish, since 1988 in the parish of Bradfield Combust with Stanningfield, in the West Suffolk district of the county of Suffolk, England. The village lies just off of the A134 road, about 5 miles (8 km) south-east of Bury St Edmunds, 5 miles/8 km north-west of Lavenham, and 10 miles/16 km north of Sudbury.

Governance

Stanningfield belongs to the West Suffolk district of the shire county of Suffolk. The three tiers of local government are Suffolk County Council, St Edmundsbury Borough Council and Bradfield Combust with Stanningfield Parish Council. The parish currently lacks a parish plan or design statement.

History

Stanningfield takes its name from the Early English name "Stanfella" or "Stansfelda" meaning "stony field". It is known that the area was occupied early in recorded British history as traces of Roman occupation has been found on one local farm. Occasional documentary references mention the village in Anglo-Saxon and Norman times, including The Domesday Book. The oldest building, St Nicholas' Church, dates back at least to the Norman period.

The 1838 Tithe Map shows the same internal road patterns as today, with roads leading out to the neighbouring villages of Hawstead, Lawshall, Great Whelnetham, Sicklesmere, Bradfield Combust and Cockfield. The nearest railway station was located in the last until it closed to passengers in 1961. The River Lark is a dominant feature, as are several village greens. Hoggard's Green, the largest, has long played an important part in community life. The pond on that green has long gone, but in 1996 a successful reclamation of an ancient pond at Old Lane was undertaken.

Recent years
A small, scattered village, Stanningfield centres on the green, the Red House inn and the nearby community shop. The inn was built in 1865; Henry Cornish was recorded as landlord in 1871. In 1877, it was bought by the brewers Greene King, along with its outbuildings and adjacent cottages.

There is a picturesque area around St Nicholas's Church, which includes the village hall (formerly the church hall), the old rectory and several old farmhouses. On the Lawshall side of the village stands Coldham Hall, dating from Tudor times. One remarkable feature is the continuity of Roman Catholicism from the Middle Ages to the present day, in a predominantly Protestant area. Ambrose Rookwood of Coldham Hall was executed for his involvement in the Gunpowder Plot.

The novelist, playwright and actress Elizabeth Inchbald (née Simpson) was born into a Catholic farming family in the village on 15 October 1773.

St Nicholas's Church

There has been a church in Stanningfield since before 1086, when the Domesday Book curtly recorded that Stanfella had a church with 16 acres (6.5 ha) of free land. Situated in a secluded spot about half a mile from the present centre of the village, Stanningfield Church is dedicated to St Nicholas of Myra in Asia Minor, from whom the Santa Claus customs derive.

Each period has added a contribution to the fabric of the church. The most remarkable exterior feature is a Decorated chancel, a bequest from the Rookwood family in the 14th century, noted for the design and craftsmanship of the window tracery. Much restoration was undertaken in the last third of the 19th century and early years of the 20th. Above the chancel arch is a 15th-century "Doom", painted on plaster in black line with some red background. This was expertly restored in 1995.

The bell-chamber stage of the 15th-century tower was reduced in height in the late 19th century and a slated pyramid roof added. Tradition has it that the repair resulted from a Colchester earthquake felt over a 150-mile radius, but subsidence of the medieval foundations is more likely. The tower had three bells, of which one has been hung again to a wooden frame just below the cap. The other two, with inscriptions from the 16th and 17th centuries, stood on the nave floor until as recently as 1967, when they were melted down for scrap.

The church is currently one of seven parishes forming the Benefice of St Edmund Way.

Listed buildings
English Heritage lists the following listed buildings within Stanningfield. The details given represent the names and addresses in use at the time of listing.

Grade I:
St Nicholas's Church, Church Road
Coldham Hall, Coldham Hall Lane

Grade II*:
Former Roman Catholic Chapel, 5 miles/8/km east of Coldham Hall, Coldham Hall Lane

Grade II:
Fox House, Bury Road – Images of England	
Newhall Cottage, Bury Road – Images of England	
Old Cottage, Chapel Road – Images of England	
Homestead and Sunrise, Chapel Road – Images of England	
Bakers Farmhouse, Church Road – Images of England	
Church Farmhouse, Church Road – Images of England	
Stable And Coach House Block, 80 metres East of Coldham Hall, Coldham Hall Lane – Images of England	
Outbuilding With Bell Turret, 20 metres North East of Coldham Hall, Coldham Hall Lane
Coldham Hall Cottage, Coldham Hall Lane
Dovecote 150 Metres South of Coldham Hall, Coldham Hall Lane
Hall Farmhouse, Donkey Lane 
Makins Farmhouse, Donkey Lane – Images of England	
Barfords, Donkey Lane 
Thatched House, The Green – Images of England	
Orchard Cottage, The Green – Images of England	
Moorside, Old Lane, IP29 4SA – Images of England	
Little Saxes Farmhouse – Images of England	
K6 Telephone Kiosk, Ixer Lane

Transport
The village has an hourly daytime bus service on Monday to Saturday to Bury St Edmunds and Sudbury. Some buses connect with trains to Cambridge and Ipswich (at Bury) or London, Liverpool Street (at Sudbury).

Demography
At the United Kingdom Census 2001, the parish of Bradfield Combust with Stanningfield had a population of 503 in 231 households. This rose to 578 in 253 households at the 2011 Census. The parish population was put at 587 in 2019.

Population change

Notable people
Elizabeth Inchbald (1753–1821) – actress, author, diarist and playwright
Residents of Coldham Hall:
Ambrose Rookwood (c. 1578–1606) – member of the failed 1605 Gunpowder Plot, a conspiracy to replace the Protestant King James I with a Catholic monarch
David Hart (1944–2011) – adviser to Margaret Thatcher, a writer and businessman who lived at Coldham Hall and Chadacre Hall
Current residents include:
Matthew Vaughn (born 1971) – film producer and director
Claudia Schiffer (born 1970) – German model and actress

Location grid

References

External links
Suffolk Churches
Stanningfield page on Parish Council site

Villages in Suffolk
Former civil parishes in Suffolk
Borough of St Edmundsbury
Thedwastre Hundred